Neonemobius variegatus, known generally as the variegated ground cricket or smaller spotted ground cricket, is a species of ground cricket in the family Trigonidiidae. It is found in North America.

References

Crickets
Articles created by Qbugbot
Insects described in 1893